Črmljenšak (in older sources Čermlenšak) is a settlement in the Slovene Hills in the Municipality of Lenart in northeastern Slovenia. The area is part of the traditional region of Styria. It is now included in the Drava Statistical Region.

There are two small chapels in the settlement. One is a Neo-Gothic building dating to the late 19th century. The second was built in 1919.

References

External links
Črmljenšak on Geopedia

Populated places in the Municipality of Lenart